A familiar stranger is an individual that is recognized, but not known.

Familiar stranger may also refer to:

Film
The Familiar Stranger, a 2001 American television film
Familiar Strangers, a 2008 American comedy-drama film

Music
 Familiar Stranger (Bob Evans album), 2013
 Familiar Stranger (Mark Wills album), 2008
Familiar Stranger: the Early Works of Geoff Moore, a 1995 album by Geoff Moore

See also
 Perfect Stranger (disambiguation)
 The Stranger (disambiguation)